Aspidimorpha lobata, is a species of leaf beetle found in India, Sri Lanka and Bangladesh.

Biology
Active in rainy season. Two morphs can be identified: golden shiny elytral disc and prothorax. The other form with dark brown elytral disc and prothorax.

References 

Cassidinae
Insects of Sri Lanka
Beetles described in 1854